The Orphéal was a keyboard instrument invented by the Belgian Georges Cloetens in 1910. It appears to have been a combination of piano, organ and harmonium, capable of reproducing approximations of the sounds of the cello, horn, etc.

The only occasion that people these days are likely to come across its name is on the back of Durand editions of Maurice Ravel's music, where an advertisement for Petit Poucet from Ma Mère l'Oye, arranged for Orphéal, still exists.

Cloetens also invented the Luthéal, which Ravel used in two works, Tzigane and L'Enfant et les Sortilèges.

References

External links
Reconstruction of the original Orphéal from Cloetens in the organ of Oudenaarde (Belgium) 

Keyboard instruments
1910 musical instruments
Experimental musical instruments